Emamzadeh-ye Seyyed Ali (also Romanized as Emāmzādeh-ye Seyyed ‘Alī; also known as Seyyed ‘Alī Mūsá Dashtāb (Persian: سيدعلي موسي دشتاب) and Emāmzādeh Seyyed ‘Alī Mūsá) is a village in Dashtab Rural District, in the Central District of Baft County, Kerman Province, Iran. At the 2006 census, its population was 31, in 12 families.

References 

Populated places in Baft County